The Gradac Monastery an endowment of queen Helen was built from 1277 to 1282 during the reign of her son king Stefan Dragutin. It lies on the elevated plateau above the river Gradačka, at the edge of the forested slopes Golija. Gradac Monastery was declared Monument of Culture of Exceptional Importance in 1979, and it is protected by Serbia.

History

The monastery Gradac was built from 1277 to 1282 and it is an endowment of Helen of Anjou, the wife of king Uroš I. She founded the first girls' school in medieval Serbia. Gradac Monastery is situated in Stara Raška region, on the wooded and secluded slopes of Golija Mountain on the place called by locals Petrov Krs. Gradac Monastery was built in the late 13th century, on the ruins of an earlier church. It is located west of the medieval fortress Brvenik. The monastery complex was included the large building Church of The Entry of the Most Holy Theotokos into the Temple, smaller temple St. Nicholas, dining room, quarters and economic building. The Church of Gradac Monastery is one nave structure with the dome, tripartite altar and rectangle choir, whose central part consists of two chapels, the main naos, and the altar. In the architecture of the shrine of Gradac Monastery that is example of monumental Serbian-Byzantine style of Raska school of architecture there are numerous Gothic, Romanesque elements, especially on the portals and on all bifocals, windows divided by a colonnette into two arches. The architectural plastic of the Gradac Monastery carries the properties of the mature and late Romanesque art, like some early Gothic, all being reflected primarily in the finishing of the portal capitol, mostly marble framed windows and a series of blind arcades of the roof corona.

The monastery was devastated at the end of the 14th century. It was partially restored at the end of the 16th century. However, it was finally deserted in the 17th century when the monks, fleeing from the Turks, left somewhere unknown, taking with them the Holy Relics of their founder. In the next 300 years, both churches and the monastery buildings caved in. During the Ottoman rule the monastery was generally with no monks and no roof cover that was removed from the church. In 1910, a  protective roof was placed on a monastery church, and during 1963–1975 a complete reconstruction of the main church was performed by the Institute of the Protection of Cultural monuments of Serbia conducted extensive restoration works on the main Church of the Entry of the Most Holy Theotokos into the Temple and the Chapel of St Nicholas. The fresco decoration of the interior is considerably damaged but the endower's composition is still visible and the original iconostasis is preserved in primary edition. Since 1982. construction of living quarters began and the monastery was revived again, then abbot was shijarhimandrit Julian Knežević (1918–2001). The monastery is a nunnery nowadays.

Cultural, historical and tourist destinations near the monastery

Gradac Monastery is located in Golija tourist region, and near the tourist center Kopaonik (from Suvo shoot is about ). It is a complementary tourist value Golija mountain, and as a supplement and tourist Kopaonik. Proximity of Kopaonik is significant because on the tourist season is significantly origination hikers. Significantly, the proximity of Jošanička Banja in relation to which the monastery Gradac is complementary tourist value. Jošanička Spa is away from the monastery about ).

For the tourist site of the monastery Gradac is important and its affiliation Ibar cultural tourist zone, where it apart and found monastery and: Žiča Studenica Old Pavlica, Nova Pavlica and Banjska Monastery. There are also fort's: Maglič, Brvenik and Zvečan. In this zone continues the cultural-tourist zone Valley Raška. It monasteries: Sopoćani Djurdjevi Stupovi and Petrova Church from Stari Ras with Monuments in Novi Pazar etc.. It all certainly contributes to the favorable position of the monastery Gradac tourist, especially as these important medieval monasteries and monuments are grouped in a relatively small area

The village of Gradac
The village of Gradac is located in the upper river basin Brvenica which occurs exactly in the center of village. It consists of three main parts: Kotraža (Radović Čorbić), Gornji Gradac (Čorbić, Head, Munaci and Raković) and Donji Gradac (Vesović, Nikolic and Češljar). Gradac Monastery is located in Gornji Gradac (Munaci).

Gallery

See also
Studenica
Žiča
Sopoćani
Mileševa
Visoki Dečani
Gračanica
Nemanjić dynasty
Spatial Cultural-Historical Units of Great Importance

External links
Gradac Monastery- Virtual Tour and Photo Collection of the Blago Fund
Sopoćani and Gradac - About the relation of funerary programmes of the two churches by Branislav Todić
Monastery Gradac (official site)
Gradac monastery: it maker Helen of Anjou
Photo of Gradac monastery
Monastery Gradac-photo gallery
Dynasties that ruled Europe - House of Courtenay  and Serbian queen, No 3146, 2012.

13th-century Serbian Orthodox church buildings
Cultural Monuments of Exceptional Importance (Serbia)
Raška District
Serbian Orthodox monasteries in Serbia
13th-century establishments in Serbia
Christian monasteries established in the 13th century
Nemanjić dynasty endowments